The AV-TM 300 Tactical Missile or MTC-300 (Míssil Tático de Cruzeiro) is a Brazilian cruise missile developed by Avibras for the Astros II system. Nicknamed Matador ("killer"), it is projected to be a less expensive alternative to the American Tomahawk (missile). The missile is equipped with a central computer that combines a Ring laser gyroscope, connected to an active GPS navigation device  that uninterruptedly supplies positioning information for course correction. Apparently there also will be a naval version called X-300. The missile can use a single warhead of 200 to 500 kg high explosive or cluster munition warhead with 64 submunitions for anti-personnel or anti-tank targets.

Development
The first version of the missile was created in 1999, however, the development of the missile officially started in September 2001. Eventually, the original specifications underwent a major modification, including removal of the retractable wings and addition of composite materials. The missile uses solid-fuel rockets for launching, and a turbojet during the subsonic cruise flight. The missile uses  a variant of the Turbomachine TJ1000, an indigenous turbojet engine developed by Turbomachine company and used by Avibras under a manufacturing license agreement.

The Brazilian Army signed the development contract and invested R$100 million since 2012, the development stages are being finalized by 2021 and already have about two dozen launches from test fields such as the CLBI. The force has commissioned an initial batch of 100 units. In addition to being used in the land force, the weaponry can be used by the ASTROS of the Brazilian Marine Corps.

Air Force variant 
The MICLA-BR (acronym in Portuguese for Brazilian Long-Range Cruise Missile) development was confirmed by the Brazilian Air Force in September 2019, to equip the JAS F-39 Gripen fighters. The first tests of the missile were conducted on 2019 with a Brazilian F-5 EM as a test platform. The Brazilian Air Force intends to declare the MICLA-BR fully operational in the early 2030s.

Operators 

Brazilian Army - used in the ASTROS system
Brazilian Marine Corps - used in the ASTROS system
Brazilian Air Force - in development for the JAS F-39 Gripen

See also

3M-51 Alfa
Atmaca
Babur
BGM-109 Tomahawk
BrahMos
Hyunmoo-3
Khalij Fars
3M-54 Kalibr
Noor ASCM
P-800 Oniks
Qader
Ra'ad
RK-55
SOM
YJ-18
Zafar

References 

Cruise missiles of Brazil
Weapons and ammunition introduced in 2021